The Money Weekly is a Chinese investment and financial management magazine established on 18 March 2001 and headquartered in Shanghai. It is the first financial management magazine catering to investors in Mainland China.

Presented by Shanghai Johnson Group and Shanghai Century Publishing Group, Money Weekly is published every Monday in Shanghai and is distributed throughout China.

Money Weekly annually hosts financial management fairs in Shanghai and surrounding cities.

References

2001 establishments in China
Business magazines published in China
Chinese-language magazines
Magazines established in 2001
Magazines published in Shanghai
Weekly magazines published in China